Bezdead  is a commune in the northeast of Dâmbovița County, Muntenia, Romania. It is composed of six villages: Bezdead, Broșteni, Costișata, Măgura, Tunari and Valea Morii. In 2011, Bezdead had a population of 4,595.

Photos

References

External links

Communes in Dâmbovița County
Localities in Muntenia